Oneonta may refer to several places:

Communities
Oneonta, New York, a small city and inspiration for some of the other "Oneontas"
Oneonta (town), New York, a town that surrounds the City of Oneonta
Oneonta, Alabama, Blount County
Oneonta, Kentucky, a location southeast of Cincinnati, Ohio
Oneonta, Kansas, Cloud County
Oneonta, California, or Oneonta Beach, now part of Imperial Beach, California

Geographic Locations
Oneonta Beach, on the island of Oahu, Hawaii
Oneonta Creek, a river in Otsego County, New York
Oneonta Gorge, in Oregon, containing Oneonta Falls, in the Columbia River Gorge
Oneonta Lake, in Marinette County, Wisconsin

Schools
State University of New York at Oneonta in Oneonta, New York

See also 
Oneonta (sidewheeler), a steamboat on the Columbia River